Reluctant Guru is a book by R. K. Narayan published in 1974 by Orient Paperbacks. The book consists entirely of discursive essays, some of which were his weekly contributions to The Hindu. Some of the essays relate to the topic of his American stay, describing with his characteristic irony, the expectations of Americans that he would show them the key to the spiritual life of Indians. One criticism of the book is that the essays were too short and therefore lacking in depth.

References

Books by R. K. Narayan
1974 non-fiction books
Indian essay collections